Monika Kratochvílová (born 27 February 1974) is a Czech former professional tennis player.

Kratochvílová competed on the professional tour during the 1990s and had a career-high singles ranking of 372 in the world. She performed best in doubles, with 17 ITF titles to her name and a top ranking of 159. All of her WTA Tour main-draw appearances were in doubles, including quarterfinal appearances at Kitzbühel in 1991 and Warsaw in 1995.

ITF finals

Singles (1–2)

Doubles (17–9)

References

External links
 
 

1974 births
Living people
Czechoslovak female tennis players
Czech female tennis players